The Jordan Journal of Mechanical and Industrial Engineering is a peer-reviewed scientific journal that is published by the Hashemite University and Ministry of Higher Education and Scientific Research (Jordan). It was established in 2007 and covers the field of engineering, including computational fluid dynamics, thermodynamics, mechatronics, and renewable energy. The journal is abstracted and indexed in Scopus.

External links 

Mechanical engineering journals
Publications established in 2007
English-language journals
Biannual journals
2007 establishments in Jordan
Hashemite University